Sati Anasuya is a 1957 Telugu-language Hindu mythological film, based on the life of Anasuya, produced by Sundarlal Nehata under the Rajyasri Productions banner and directed by K. B. Nagabhushanam. It stars N. T. Rama Rao, Anjali Devi, and Jamuna, with music composed by Ghantasala.

This film was dubbed into Tamil under the same title and released in 1958. Udhayakumar wrote the dialogues and Ku. Sa. Krishnamoorthy penned the lyrics. T. M. Ibrahim scored music for this Tamil version.

Plot 
Anasuya the wife of Atri Mahamuni shows great devotion to her husband. Sivananda, the head of Chitrakuta where Atri Mahamuni lives orders one should pray only to God, but not the husband as per Anasuya. Meanwhile, River Ganga is being polluted due to the sins of humanity. she goes to goddesses Lakshmi, Parvathi, and Saraswathi to relieve, but they fail. Here Sage Narada guides her to request Anasuya when she is relieved of her sins. Learning it, Tri Matas feel jealous of Anasuya. Parallelly, Sivananda's son Sukhananda loves a girl Narmada but according to Narmada's horoscope, her husband dies soon after the marriage, so, Sivananda refuses the proposal. The grief-stricken Narmada wants to go to heaven alive when to insults Anasuya, Sivananda advises Narmada to seek her help and she succeeds in sending her to heaven. But Narmada feels it as a dream when Anasuya advises her to marry the man whomever she sees next sunrise. Tri Matas to take revenge against Anasuya they send an ugly leprosy patient Kaushika in front of Narmada. Yet, she marries him and starts serving him with devotion when everyone criticizes them which they could not tolerate, and leave for pilgrimage. Narmada keeps Kaushika in a cart and pulls it, in between their journey Tri Matas create so many obstacles but Narmada does not yield.

Frustrated Tri Matas sends Nagaraja to bite Atri Mahamuni, but Anasuya turns the snake into a garland. After that, Tri Matas send Manmadha to molest her when Atri is out of Ashram but Anasuya recognizes and curses him to become blind. Thereby, they create famine in the Chitrakuta area, exploiting it, Sivananda denounces Anasuya for the deed, so, to relieve the public from drought she prays to Ganga and it starts raining. In that anger, Sivananda set fire to Ashram, but he was burnt and loses his eyesight. But with the blessings of Anasuya, he gets back his vision and bows his head down. Meanwhile, Narmada and Kaushika reach Badri where out of hunger Kaushika kicks Mandavya Maharshi who curses him to die at the sunrise. Angered Narmada orders to stop the sunrise when the entire universe standstill. In that perturbed situation, Atri and Anasuya request Narmada to take back her word, she obeys it and Kaushika dies. But with the blessings of Anusuya, Kaushika is rejuvenated as a handsome person. As a final attempt, Tri Matas send the divine trinity Lords Brahma, Vishnu, and Siva to test Anasuya. To make them understand the virtue of Anasuya, they move. Anasuya invites them when they ask her to feed them naked. Nevertheless, she agrees and fulfills their wish by transforming them into babies. Tri Matas discovers it, immediately rushes to Anasuya's Ashram, and pleads with her to return her husband and she does so. Impressed, the divine trinity gives a boon to her that 3 of them are going to be born as their son. Finally, the movie ends with the trinity merging and forming into three-headed Lord Dattatreya.

Cast

Soundtrack 

Music composed by Ghantasala.

Reception 
Malhar of Zaminryot criticized the movie as poorly made and termed it as a "sugar coated pill". He reviewed the story and the characterization as bad. He wrote positively about the performance by the main cast.

References

External links 

Hindu mythological films
Hindu devotional films
Films scored by Ghantasala (musician)
1950s Tamil-language films
1950s Telugu-language films
Films scored by T. M. Ibrahim